Whitfeld is a surname. Notable people with the surname include:

 Francis Whitfeld (1852–1924), English cricketer
 George Whitfeld (1878–1945), English cricketer, nephew of Herbert
 Herbert Whitfeld (1858–1909), English amateur sportsman

See also
 Whitfield (disambiguation)